In mathematics, Serre and localizing subcategories form important classes of subcategories of an abelian category. Localizing subcategories are certain Serre subcategories. They are strongly linked to the notion of a quotient category.

Serre subcategories 

Let  be an abelian category. A non-empty full subcategory  is called a Serre subcategory (or also a dense subcategory), if for every short exact sequence  in  the object  is in  if and only if the objects 
In words:  is closed under subobjects, quotient objects
and extensions.

Localizing subcategories 

Let  be locally small. The Serre subcategory  is called localizing if the quotient functor
 has a
right adjoint
. Since then , as a left adjoint, preserves colimits, each localizing subcategory is closed under colimits. The functor  (or sometimes ) is also called the localization functor, and  the section functor. The section functor is left-exact and fully faithful.

If the abelian category  is moreover
cocomplete and has injective hulls (e.g. if it is a Grothendieck category), then a Serre
subcategory  is localizing if and only if
 is closed under arbitrary coproducts (a.k.a.
direct sums). Hence the notion of a localizing subcategory is
equivalent to the notion of a hereditary torsion class.

If  is a Grothendieck category and  a localizing subcategory, then  and the quotient category
 are again Grothendieck categories.

The Gabriel-Popescu theorem implies that every Grothendieck category is the quotient category of a module category  (with  a suitable ring) modulo a localizing subcategory.

See also 

 Giraud subcategory

References 

 Nicolae Popescu; 1973; Abelian Categories with Applications to Rings and Modules; Academic Press, Inc.; out of print.

Category theory
Homological algebra